Slimming World is a Derbyshire, England-based weight loss organisation that caters for men and women of all ages. It was founded in Derbyshire in 1969 by Margaret Miles-Bramwell, who remains its chairman.

Its focus is predominantly weight loss, and supports members to maintain a healthy weight once they reach their target. It operates through a network of 3,500 "consultants" across the country.

Slimming World offers an eating plan based on food satiety and energy density as well as a group support service called IMAGE Therapy.

Company history

The company began in 1969 with a handful of groups in Derbyshire before expanding into Yorkshire. By the 1980s, Slimming World had 700 classes in the UK and by 2012 there were more than 10,000 groups, making it the largest slimming club in the UK and Ireland.

Slimming World launched its charity SMILES (Slimmers Making It a Little Easier for Someone) in 1997 and has since raised more than £25,000,000 for good causes.

Slimming World publishes recipe books and directories for group members and launched Slimming World magazine in 1998.

In 2001, the company launched a referral scheme in which GPs could "prescribe" 12 weeks' attendance to patients wishing to lose weight. In 2011, a paper in the journal Obesity Facts showed patients attending at least 10 sessions achieved a clinically significant loss of 5% of their body weight.

Slimming World now works with about 60 UK health authorities and more than 100,000 patients had been referred by April 2011. It also signed the Government's Public Health Responsibility Deal, in which participants pledged to help the public eat more healthily and exercise more.

Diet overview

Efficacy
In its 2014 guidance, the National Institute for Health and Care Excellence lists Slimming World alongside the Rosemary Conley and Weight Watchers programmes as being "effective at 12 to 18 months".

Physical activity
Slimming World encourages members to introduce physical activity into their everyday routines. It introduces this gently with activities such as walking up stairs instead of taking the lift. Members get bronze, silver, gold and platinum awards as their activity levels increase, achieving platinum when they routinely exercise or undertake 30 minutes' activity five times weekly. Since 2011, Slimming World has helped more than 150,000 people to become more active.

Health and pregnancy
Slimming World works in partnership with the Royal College of Midwives and is the first national slimming organisation to support pregnant women and breastfeeding mothers to manage their weight healthily during pregnancy. Its policy was written in collaboration with the college and mothers take part with the consent of their midwife.

See also
Dieting
List of diets

References 

Brand name diet products
Health care companies established in 1969
Companies based in Derbyshire
Food manufacturers of the United Kingdom
1969 establishments in England